"Never Turn Away" is a song by English electronic band Orchestral Manoeuvres in the Dark (OMD), released on 29 October 1984 as the fourth and final single from their fifth studio album, Junk Culture (1984). Paul Humphreys sings lead vocals on the track.

History
The song was first featured on the band's "Showcase Tour" in September 1983 in an unfinished form with the unofficial title of "The Never Song". The short tour, intended to re-establish the band after the commercial flop of Dazzle Ships earlier in the year, also featured other new songs which would appear on the Junk Culture album in 1984, as well as the future "Never Turn Away" B-side "Wrappup". Although writing credits are attributed to "OMD", "Never Turn Away" was written by Paul Humphreys. In a 1998 interview Andy McCluskey stated that although the idea for the title was his, Humphreys wrote everything else, adding "I honestly don't know what Never Turn Away's about". It was the band's second single to feature Humphreys on vocals after "Souvenir" in 1981.

Critical reception
Reading Eagle writer Carl Brown Jr. named "Never Turn Away" as the standout track from Junk Culture, calling it "a soft, subtle song that succeeds from both a melodic and lyrical viewpoint". Conversely, Smash Hits reviewer and Pet Shop Boys singer Neil Tennant – otherwise a proponent of OMD – described the track as "sad, drifting music" and "boring". OMD frontman Andy McCluskey later joked, "Well, he would know!"

Retrospectively, John Bergstrom in PopMatters described the song as "beautiful". Ned Raggett in AllMusic singled out the "elegiac" number as one of the highlights from its parent album.

B-sides
The song "Wrappup" is a dubbed version of the song "All Wrapped Up" (which features on Junk Culture). The second B-side, a live version of "Waiting for the Man", only featured on the extended version of the single (the extended version of "Never Turn Away" has an extra verse added to the song). The live version of "Waiting for the Man" was recorded at the Hammersmith Odeon in London on the Junk Culture tour, featuring additional brass parts by Graham and Neil Weir who had worked with the band on the Junk Culture album. The 7" picture disc features a unique extended version of "Never Turn Away".

"Wrappup" is available on the bonus disc of the 2015 deluxe re-issue of Junk Culture, although on initial pressings "All Wrapped Up" was included in its place by mistake. The disc also includes the extended version of "Never Turn Away".

Track listing
All tracks written and composed by OMD; except where noted.
7" vinyl
 "Never Turn Away" – 3:57
 "Wrappup" – 4:00

7" vinyl picture disc
 "Never Turn Away" – 4:34
 "Wrappup" – 4:00

12" vinyl
 "Never Turn Away" (extended version) – 6:31
 "Wrappup" – 4:00
 "Waiting for the Man" (live) (Lou Reed) – 3:31

Charts

References

External links

1984 singles
Orchestral Manoeuvres in the Dark songs
Songs written by Paul Humphreys
1984 songs
Virgin Records singles